Kalmykovsky is a rural locality (a khutor) and the administrative center of Kalmykovskoye Rural Settlement, Kletsky District, Volgograd Oblast, Russia. The population was 923 as of 2010. There are 28 streets.

Geography 
Kalmykovsky is located in steppe, on the Krepkaya River, 44 km southwest of Kletskaya (the district's administrative centre) by road. Manoylin is the nearest rural locality.

References 

Rural localities in Kletsky District